Bothriomyrmex syrius is a species of ant in the genus Bothriomyrmex. Described by Forel in 1910, the species is endemic to Greece, Israel, Lebanon and Montenegro.

References

Bothriomyrmex
Hymenoptera of Europe
Hymenoptera of Asia
Insects described in 1910